The 1980 NBA playoffs were the postseason tournament of the National Basketball Association's 1979–80 season. The tournament concluded with the Western Conference champion Los Angeles Lakers defeating the Eastern Conference champion Philadelphia 76ers 4 games to 2 in the NBA Finals. The Lakers earned their seventh NBA title, their second since moving from Minneapolis.

With center Kareem Abdul-Jabbar out with a severely sprained ankle, Johnson started at center instead, and ultimately played all five positions on the court in the game.

Philadelphia earned their third Eastern Conference championship, but were unsuccessful in capturing their second NBA title.

The Milwaukee Bucks appeared in the playoffs for the last time as a member of the West; the Houston Rockets and San Antonio Spurs likewise appeared for the last time playing for the East. They switched conferences (along with the Chicago Bulls) in the 1980–81 season with the addition of the Dallas Mavericks. The Bucks made the playoffs for the first time since 1978, starting a string of twelve consecutive appearances that included three Conference Finals appearances (1983, 1984, and 1986) and seven consecutive division titles (1980-1986). They did not miss the playoffs again until 1992.

Bracket

First round

Eastern Conference first round

(3) Philadelphia 76ers vs. (6) Washington Bullets

This was the third playoff meeting between these two teams, with the Bullets winning the first two meetings.

(4) Houston Rockets vs. (5) San Antonio Spurs
The Rockets gained home-court advantage due to a better record within the Central Division (20-10 to the Spurs' 14-16). Both teams had 41-41 records and split their season series 3-3. 

This was the first playoff meeting between the Rockets and the Spurs.

Western Conference first round

(3) Seattle SuperSonics vs. (6) Portland Trail Blazers

This was the second playoff meeting between these two teams, with the SuperSonics winning the first meeting.

(4) Phoenix Suns vs. (5) Kansas City Kings

This was the second playoff meeting between these two teams, with the Suns winning the first meeting.

Conference semifinals

Eastern Conference semifinals

(1) Boston Celtics vs. (4) Houston Rockets

 Rick Barry's final NBA game.

This was the second playoff meeting between these two teams, with the Celtics winning the first meeting.

(2) Atlanta Hawks vs. (3) Philadelphia 76ers

This was the first playoff meeting between the Hawks and the 76ers.

Western Conference semifinals

(1) Los Angeles Lakers vs. (4) Phoenix Suns

This was the second playoff meeting between these two teams, with the Lakers winning the first meeting.

(2) Milwaukee Bucks vs. (3) Seattle SuperSonics

 Dennis Johnson hits 3 pointer with 1 second left.

 Attendance of 40,172 was a previous NBA record.

This was the first playoff meeting between the Bucks and the SuperSonics.

Conference finals

Eastern Conference finals

(1) Boston Celtics vs. (3) Philadelphia 76ers

 Pete Maravich's final NBA game; Dave Cowens' final NBA game with Celtics.

This was the 15th playoff meeting between these two teams, with the Celtics winning eight of the first 14 meetings.

Western Conference finals

(1) Los Angeles Lakers vs. (3) Seattle SuperSonics

 Jack Sikma hits a game-winning free throw with 2 seconds left.

 Games 3 & 4 were not played at either the Kingdome or the Seattle Center Coliseum due to being unavailable.

This was the third playoff meeting between these two teams, with the SuperSonics winning the first two meetings.

NBA Finals: (W1) Los Angeles Lakers vs. (E3) Philadelphia 76ers

 Julius Erving makes the "Up and Under" move.

 Kareem Abdul-Jabbar dunks the clutch 3-point play with 33 seconds left.

 Magic Johnson starts at Center.

This was the third playoff meeting between these two teams, with the Lakers winning the first two meetings. These series took place prior to the relocation of the Lakers (1960) and 76ers (formerly Nationals) (1963).

References

External links
 Basketball-Reference.com's 1980 NBA Playoffs page

National Basketball Association playoffs
Playoffs
Sports in Portland, Oregon

fi:NBA-kausi 1979–1980#Pudotuspelit